P. J. Carroll & Company Limited, often called Carroll's, is an Irish manufacturing company of tobacco. Having been established in 1824, P.J. Carroll is the oldest tobacco manufacturer in the country, and currently a subsidiary of British American Tobacco. 

Its cigarette brands were among the best selling in Ireland in the twentieth century. Its factory was for decades the largest employer in Dundalk.

History
Patrick James Carroll (b. 1803) completed his apprenticeship as a tobacconist in 1824 and opened a shop in Dundalk, later also manufacturing cigars. He moved to Liverpool in England in the 1850s. His son Vincent Stannus Carroll expanded the firm in the later 19th century. His son James Marmion Carroll moved to a house outside Dundalk. A second factory was opened, in Liverpool, in 1923. The company went public in 1934.

A purpose-built factory opened in 1970. Designed by Ronnie Tallon of Michael Scott and Partners, it was described by the journalist Frank McDonald as "way ahead of anything else in Ireland at the time". In 1974, to mark the 150th anniversary of its founding, P.J. Carroll published an illustrated booklet by the writer James Plunkett: P. J. Carroll & Co. Ltd, Dublin & Dundalk - A Retrospect, outlining the development of the company in its historical context.

Carroll's was acquired by Rothmans in 1990; Rothmans was acquired by British American Tobacco Plc in 1998. The company's share of the Irish tobacco market is around 17%. In 2002, the Dundalk site was sold for €16.4m to the Department of Education and repurposed for the campus of Dundalk Institute of Technology. Carroll's rented back a small section for its remaining factory operations, until finally ceasing its Dundalk operations in 2008. Carrolls remains an Irish company with deep connections to hundreds of retirees and nearly 40 staff based in their Dublin offices.

In 2013, some lawmakers suggested PJ Carroll should be prohibited from speaking with lawmakers on the basis of the WHO Framework Convention on Tobacco Control (FCTC).  PJ Carroll comes under the definition of  Tobacco Industry as set out by the FCTC, but the FCTC does not prohibit engagement between tobacco companies and public representatives, but puts in place strict rules relating to transparency.

Brands

 "Carrolls Number 1", its first filter cigarette, was launched in 1958.
 "Carrolls Additive Free* Red" and "Carrolls Additive Free* Blue" was launched in 2013 as additive free* cigarettes started to gain popularity across Western Europe. (*No additives in the tobacco blend does NOT mean a less harmful cigarette)
 "Pall Mall" is one of PJ Carroll's strongest growing brands.
 Vogue is PJ Carroll's premium cigarette brand.
 "Major"

Of international brands, Carroll's manufactured Rothmans and Dunhill and distributed Winfield, and Lucky Strike
 "Sweet Afton", launched in 1919, was named after "'Afton Waters" by Robert Burns, whose sister Agnes was buried in a graveyard opposite the old Carrolls factory in Church Street, Dundalk. Sweet Afton cigarettes were discontinued in the Autumn of 2011.

Sponsorship
Carroll's was a major sponsor of sport in Ireland until restrictions were imposed on tobacco advertising. The company had naming rights over the GAA All Stars Awards (1971–78); and Irish showjumping horses of the 1970s and 80s, such as "Carroll's Boomerang".

In golf, Carroll's was the sponsor of several professional tournaments including the Carroll's International (1963 to 1974), the Carroll's Number 1 Tournament (1965 to 1968), the Carroll's Irish Match Play Championship (1969 to 1982), and most notably the revived Irish Open from 1975 to 1993.

References

External links
 

Tobacco companies of Ireland
Dundalk
Manufacturing companies established in 1824
British American Tobacco
1824 establishments in Ireland